Samuel Wilson Parker (September 9, 1805 – February 1, 1859), was an American lawyer and politician who served two terms as a U.S. Representative from Indiana from 1851 to 1855.

Biography 
Of German and English ancestry, Parker was born near Watertown, New York. He pursued academic studies. He was graduated from Miami University, Oxford, Ohio, in 1828. He studied law. He was admitted to the bar in 1831 and commenced practice in Connersville, Indiana. He served as prosecuting attorney of Fayette County from December 10, 1836, to December 10, 1838.

Political career 
He served as member of the State house of representatives in 1839 and 1843. He served in the State senate 1841-1843. He was an unsuccessful candidate for election in 1849 to the Thirty-first Congress.

Parker was elected as a Whig to the Thirty-second and Thirty-third Congresses (March 4, 1851 – March 3, 1855). He did not seek renomination in 1855.

Death 
He died near Sackets Harbor, New York, February 1, 1859. He was interred in the private cemetery on the Old Elm farm,, in Connersville, Indiana.

References

1805 births
1859 deaths
American people of English descent
American people of German descent
Miami University alumni
People from Connersville, Indiana
Politicians from Watertown, New York
Whig Party members of the United States House of Representatives from Indiana
19th-century American politicians